Azad Ari Mardan is an Indian politician and a former member of 17th Legislative Assembly of Uttar Pradesh of India. He represented the Lalganj constituency of Uttar Pradesh and is a member of the Bahujan Samaj Party.

Early life and education
Mardan was born 1 July 1972 in Azamgarh, Uttar Pradesh, to his father Gandhi Azad. He belongs to the Chamar community, a Scheduled Caste. He got a B.A. degree in 1992 and a LLB in 1995 from Allahabad University. He married Sangeeta Azad; they have one son and two daughters.

Political career
Mardan has been a member of the 17th Legislative Assembly of Uttar Pradesh. Since 2017, he has represented the Lalganj constituency and is a member of the Bahujan Samaj Party. He defeated Bharatiya Janata Party candidate Daroga Prasad Saroj by a margin of 2,227 votes.

His wife Sangeeta Azad was also elected Member of Parliament from Lalganj Loksabha in 2019 general elections by defeating BJP's Neelam Sonkar.

Posts held

References

Uttar Pradesh MLAs 2017–2022
Bahujan Samaj Party politicians from Uttar Pradesh
Living people
Politicians from Azamgarh district
1972 births
University of Allahabad alumni
Samajwadi Party politicians from Uttar Pradesh